Andrea Donna de Matteo (born January 19, 1972) is an American actress. She is best known for her role as Adriana La Cerva on the HBO television drama The Sopranos (1999–2006), for which she received the Primetime Emmy Award for Outstanding Supporting Actress in a Drama Series in 2004. Other notable roles include Gina Tribbiani on Joey (2004–2006), Wendy Case on Sons of Anarchy (2008–2014), Angie Bolen on Desperate Housewives (2009–2010), and Detective Tess Nazario on Shades of Blue (2016–2018).

Early life
De Matteo was born in Whitestone, Queens, New York City. Her mother, Donna, is a playwright and playwriting teacher who has been on faculty at HB Studio, and her father, Albert, was a furniture manufacturer who was owner and CEO of Avery Boardman and Carlyle. She is of Italian descent, and grew up in a Catholic family.

After graduating from the Loyola School, de Matteo earned a Bachelor of Fine Arts in film production from New York University's Tisch School of the Arts, intending to become a film director. She additionally studied acting at the HB Studio.

Career 
De Matteo's role in The Sopranos was one of her earliest, helping to launch her career. She has appeared in several films including Swordfish, Deuces Wild, The Perfect You, Prey for Rock & Roll and the 2005 remake of John Carpenter's 1976 action film Assault on Precinct 13. She had the starring role in Abel Ferrara's R Xmas for which she received some very positive reviews.

In 2004, de Matteo won an Emmy for Best Supporting Actress (Drama) for her role as Adriana on The Sopranos (season 5) and was nominated for a Golden Globe the same year, for the same role. 

From 2004 to 2006, de Matteo portrayed Joey Tribbiani's sister Gina in the Friends spin-off Joey. The show was cancelled after two seasons.

De Matteo played the role of Wendy Case in the FX original series Sons of Anarchy. The pilot episode aired September 3, 2008, and De Matteo continued making regular appearances into the series' sixth season. She was promoted to a series regular for the seventh and final season.

De Matteo played Angie Bolen, the mother of the Bolen family, on season 6 of the ABC show Desperate Housewives. She left Desperate Housewives at the season 6 finale in 2010, due to personal reasons.

In 2012, she guest starred in Showtime's Californication.

De Matteo played the stepmother of Steve Wilde, the main character of the FOX comedy Running Wilde, appearing in season 1, episode 9. De Matteo co-starred as Krissi Cates in the film adaptation of Dark Places (2015), with Charlize Theron, Chloë Grace Moretz, and Nicholas Hoult. In 2015, she was cast as Det. Tess Nazario in the NBC drama series Shades of Blue, starring alongside Jennifer Lopez and Ray Liotta.

De Matteo and Chris Kushner began hosting a rewatch podcast of The Sopranos on March 13, 2020, called Made Women; in July, the podcast was retooled and renamed Gangster Goddess Broad-Cast.

Personal life
In 1997, de Matteo opened Filth Mart, an East Village clothing store with her then-boyfriend Michael Sportes. They closed the store in 2004.

De Matteo started dating musician Shooter Jennings in 2001. They became engaged on June 11, 2009, when Jennings proposed onstage at the Stanley Theater during a show in Utica, New York. They have two children together, daughter Alabama Gypsyrose Jennings and son Waylon Albert "Blackjack" Jennings. Jennings and de Matteo eventually ended their relationship without marrying. In July 2015, de Matteo became engaged to Whitesnake bass guitarist Michael Devin.

De Matteo lost her apartment home of 22 years, as did dozens of other residents, when a gas explosion and raging fire destroyed three East Village, Manhattan buildings on March 26, 2015.

Filmography

Film

Television

References

External links

 

20th-century American actresses
21st-century American actresses
Actresses from New York City
American film actresses
American people of Italian descent
American television actresses
Living people
1972 births
Outstanding Performance by a Supporting Actress in a Drama Series Primetime Emmy Award winners
Tisch School of the Arts alumni
People from Whitestone, Queens
People from the East Village, Manhattan
Year of birth missing (living people)